The 1995–96 Santa Clara Broncos men's basketball team represented Santa Clara University in the 1995-96 Season. Led by head coach Dick Davey, the Broncos finished with a record of 20–9, and a regular season record of 19–8, placing first in the West Coast Conference. Throughout the season, Canadian point guard Steve Nash was a standout performer for the Broncos, winning his second consecutive WCC Player of the Year. Following the season, Nash would enter the NBA draft, being selected 15th overall by the Phoenix Suns. In his NBA career, Nash would play two tenures with the Suns, being named MVP twice, he would also play for the Dallas Mavericks and Los Angeles Lakers.

Roster

Schedule and results

|-
!colspan=9 style=| Regular season

|-
!colspan=9 style=| WCC Tournament

|-
!colspan=9 style=| NCAA Tournament

Rankings

Awards and honors
Steve Nash – WCC Player of the Year

Team players in the 1996 NBA draft

References

Santa Clara Broncos men's basketball seasons
Santa Clara
1995 in sports in California
1996 in sports in California
Santa Clara